ANAPROF 2004 is the 2004 season of the Panamanian football league, ANAPROF.  The season started on February 13, 2004, with the Torneo Apertura Bellsouth 2004 and finalized on November 7, 2004, with the Torneo Clausura Bellsouth 2004. Both the Apertura and Clausura champion was Arabe Unido, therefore, for the third time in ANAPROF history, Arabe Unido were crowned ANAPROF 2004 champions without the need to play a grand final.

Change for 2004
The number of teams in the league increased from 8 to 10.
River Plate F.C. were renamed Colón River F.C. at the end of the Apertura championship.
For the Clausura championship the final was played in two matches, each at the respective team's stadium.

Teams

Apertura 2004

Standings

Results table

Final round

Semifinals 1st Leg

Semifinals 2nd Leg

Final

Top goal scorer

Clausura 2004

Standings

Results table

Final round

Semifinals 1st Leg

Semifinals 2nd Leg

Final 1st Leg

Final 2nd Leg

Grand final
Cancelled as Árabe Unido won both tournaments.

Relegation table

Local derby statistics

El Super Clasico Nacional - Tauro v Plaza Amador

Clasico del Pueblo - Plaza Amador v Chorillo

References
RSSF ANAPROF 2004

ANAPROF seasons
1
Pan
1
Pan